The Leibstandarte SS Adolf Hitler (LSSAH) was founded in September 1933 as Adolf Hitler's personal bodyguard formation. It was given the title Leibstandarte Adolf Hitler (LAH) in November, 1933. On 13 April 1934, by order of Himmler, the regiment became known as the Leibstandarte SS Adolf Hitler (LSSAH). In 1939 the LSSAH became a separate unit of the Waffen-SS aside the SS-TV and the SS-VT.

The LSSAH independently participated in combat during the Invasion of Poland (1939).  Elements of the LSSAH later joined the SS-VT prior to Operation Barbarossa in 1941 and by the end of World War II they had been increased in size from a Regiment to a Panzer Division.

SS-Stabswache Berlin February 1933 
117 Men under Sepp Dietrich

Leibstandarte Adolf Hitler November 1933 
1st Battalion
1st Company
2nd Company
Machine Gun Company
2nd Battalion
1st Company
2nd Company
Motor Company

Infantry Regiment Leibstandarte SS Adolf Hitler September 1939 
Regimental Headquarters (Josef Dietrich)
1st Infantry Battalion
1st Company
2nd Company
3rd Company
4th (MG) Company
2nd Infantry Battalion
5th Company
6th Company
7th Company
8th (MG) Company
3rd Infantry Battalion
9th Company
10th Company
11th Company
12th (MG) Company
Panzerabwehrkanone Company  (Kurt Meyer)
Reconnaissance Company
Motor Cycle Company
Engineer Company
Signals Company
Artillery Battalion
 4th Wach Battalion (Ceremonial and Guard Duties)

Infantry Regiment (mot) Leibstandarte SS Adolf Hitler—April 1941 
(Brigade size formation)

 Regimental Headquarters Staff (Josef Dietrich)
 1st SS Infantry Battalion (mot): (Fritz Witt)
 2nd SS Infantry Battalion (mot): (Theodor Wisch)
 3rd SS Infantry Battalion (mot): (SS-Sturmbannführer Wilhelm Weidenhaupt)
 4th SS Infantry Battalion (mot): (SS-Sturmbannführer Jahnke)
 5th SS Infantry Battalion (mot): (SS-Sturmbannführer Van Bibber)
 SS Heavy Infantry Battalion (mot) LSSAH: (SS-Sturmbannführer Steineck)
 SS Anti-aircraft Battalion 1 LSSAH: (Bernhard Krause)
 SS Assault gun (Sturmgeschütz) Battalion 1LSSAH: (Georg Schönberger)
 SS Engineer Battalion 1 LSSAH (Christian Hansen)
 SS Reconnaissance Battalion 1 LSSAH: (Kurt Meyer)

1st SS Panzer Division Leibstandarte SS Adolf Hitler - Normandy 1944 

Divisional Headquarters Staff (Theodor Wisch)
1st SS Panzer Regiment (Joachim Peiper)
I/1st Panzer Battalion (67x Panthers)
II/1st Panzer Battalion (103x Panzer IVs)
1st SS Panzergrenadier Regiment (Albert Frey)
I/1st SS Panzergrenadier Battalion
II/1st SS Panzergrenadier Battalion
III/1st SS Panzergrenadier Battalion
2nd SS Panzergrenadier Regiment (Rudolf Sandig)
I/2nd SS Panzergrenadier Battalion
II/2nd SS Panzergrenadier Battalion
III/2nd SS Panzergrenadier Battalion
1st SS Panzer Reconnaissance Battalion (Gustav Knittel)
1st SS Sturmgeschütz Battalion (45x Sturmgeschütz III)(Heinrich Heimann)
1st SS Artillery Regiment (Franz Steineck)
1st SS Artillery Battalion (2x 105mm Wespe Bty ,1x 150mm Hummel Bty)
2nd SS Artillery Battalion (2x 105mm Bty [towed])
3rd SS Artillery Battalion (2x 150mm Bty [towed], 1x 100mm Kanon Bty [towed])
1st SS Werfer Regiment (Klaus Besch) (3x 150mm Bty [towed])
1st SS Anti Aircraft Battalion (Hugo Ullerich) (3x 88 mm guns, 2x 37 mm guns)
1st SS Panzer Pioneer Battalion (Gerd Steinert)
1st SS Panzer Signal Battalion (Eugene Metz)
1st SS Medical Battalion (Dr Liebrich)
1st SS Admin Battalion (Obersturmbannführer Paul Tauber)
1st SS Repair Battalion (Alfred Gilles)
1st SS Supply Battalion (Klaus Stamp)

Note: a SS Panzer Regiment had two Panzer Battalions and a SS Panzer Grenadier Regiment had three Pz-Gren Battalions.

See also 
 Schutzstaffel

References

Citations

Bibliography
 Cook, Stan and Bender, Roger James. (1994). Leibstandarte SS Adolf Hitler: Uniforms, Organization, & History, San Jose, CA: R. James Bender Publishing. .
 Reynolds, Michael (1997). Steel Inferno: I SS Panzer Corps in Normandy, Spellmount. .

External links 
 1.SS-Panzer-Division Leibstandarte Adolf Hitler at Feldgrau.com.
 1. SS-Panzer-Division Leibstandarte SS Adolf Hitler at Axis History Factbook.
 Leibstandarte "Adolf Hitler" - Waffen SS, miscellaneous photos and Information.
 1.SS Panzer Division Leibstandarte the premier LAH reenacting unit.